The 2015 St Helens R.F.C. season is the club's 141st in its history; its 120th in rugby league. The Saints entered the season as defending champions after winning the Super League XIX title against Wigan Warriors 14-6 at Old Trafford after also winning the minor-premiership by topping the Super League ladder.
Following the departure of previous head coach Nathan Brown, Saints entered the season with a new coach, former Saints player Keiron Cunningham

Saints began the defence of their title by playing the Catalans Dragons at Langtree Park which they won. In February Saints played the South Sydney Rabbitohs in the World Club Challenge which they lost 35-0.

2015 transfers in/out

In

Out

2015 squad

Other staff

Technical staff

Boardroom staff

Preseason 

Saints played two pre-season games to warm up for their title-defence. Both games were played at Langtree Park with the first match against Widnes Vikings ending in a 16-20 defeat and the second, against rivals Wigan Warriors ending in a 28-12 victory.

Super League XX & World Club Series Fixtures/Results

2015 squad statistics

 Appearances and Points include (Super League, Challenge Cup and Play-offs) as of 24 July 2015.

 = Injured
 = Suspended

Standings

Regular season

The 2015 Super League season will see teams play every other team twice each, once home and once away, whilst playing one team for a third time at the Magic Weekend, which is a bonus round. After 23 games the league table is frozen and the teams are split up into 2 of the 3 "Super 8's". Teams finishing in the top 8 will go on to contest "Super League" and will all retain a place in the 2016 competition, as they go on to play 7 more games each, as they compete for a place in the Grand Final. Teams finishing in the bottom four (9-12) will be put alongside the top 4 teams from the 2015 Championship, in "The Qualifiers" Super 8 group. Where these teams will reset their season standings to 0 and also play 7 extra games each, as they attempt to earn a place in the 2016 Super League competition.

Table as of 26 July 2015:

Super 8's

Super League
The Super League Super 8's sees the top 8 teams from the Super League play 7 games each. Each team's points are carried over and after the 7 additional games, the top 4 teams will contest the playoff semi finals with the team in 1st hosting the team in 4th, and the team finishing 2nd hosting the 3rd placed team; the winners of these semi finals will contest the Super League Grand Final at Old Trafford. 
Teams finishing 5th, 6th, 7th and 8th after the 7 additional games will take no further part in the 2015 season and will play in Super League again in 2016.

Table as of 25 September 2015:

(Q)= Qualified for playoffs
(U)= Unable to qualify for Playoffs

2015 Tetley's Challenge Cup Fixtures\Results

References

St Helens R.F.C. seasons
St Helens RLFC season